is a dark centaur and damocloid on a retrograde and highly eccentric orbit from the outer region of the Solar System. It was first observed on 25 February 2000, by astronomers with the LINEAR program at the Lincoln Lab's ETS near Socorro, New Mexico, United States. It has not been observed since 2001.

Discovery 

 was first observed on 25 February 2000, by astronomers of the Lincoln Near-Earth Asteroid Research (LINEAR) at the Lincoln Laboratory's Experimental Test Site near Socorro, New Mexico, United States.

Orbit and classification 

 is a member of the dynamically unstable centaur and damocloid population. Given the body's dark surface and its cometary-like orbit, it may be a dormant comet.

It orbits the Sun at a distance of 2.2–19.3 AU once every 35 years and 4 months (12,893 days; semi-major axis of 10.76 AU). Its orbit has a high eccentricity of 0.79 and an inclination of 129° with respect to the ecliptic. With an inclination above 90°, It is one of about 100 known minor planets with a retrograde orbit around the Sun. The object also has a negative Tisserand's parameter.

The body's observation arc begins with its first observation at Socorro in February 2000. It was last observed in 2001 when it came to perihelion (closest approach to the Sun), and will next come to perihelion in April 2036.

Physical characteristics 

According to radiometric observations published in 2001 and 2005,  measures approximately 15.6 and 17.28 kilometers in diameter, with a corresponding albedo 0.053 and 0.027, respectively. As of 2018, no rotational lightcurve of this object has been obtained from photometric observations. The object's rotation period, pole and shape remain unknown.

Numbering and naming 

This minor planet has not been numbered by the Minor Planet Center and remains unnamed.

See also

References

External links 
 2000 DG8 at MISAO, Seiichi Yoshida
 

Damocloids

Minor planet object articles (unnumbered)

20000225
Minor planets with a retrograde orbit